Sport1 is a Lithuanian sport channel founded on 16 August 2008. It became the first sport channel in Lithuania founded by the Lithuanian television network and broadcasts all programs only in Lithuanian language.

References

External links

Television channels in Lithuania
Television channels and stations established in 2008
Sports television networks
2008 establishments in Lithuania